Bradford Peverell and Stratton Halt was a station on the Great Western Railway on what had originally been part of the Wiltshire, Somerset & Weymouth Railway. It was in the parish of Stratton, just east of the main part of the village but also close to the parish of Bradford Peverell which it was also intended to serve. The relatively modern looking concrete platforms and shelters, standard products of the former Southern Railway concrete factory at Exmouth Junction, can still be seen next to the bridge carrying the line over the A37
Dorchester - Yeovil road.

History

Opened on 22 May 1933 by the Great Western Railway, it was placed in the Western Region when the railways were nationalised in 1948. The station closed when local trains were withdrawn during the Beeching Axe, taking effect on 3 October 1966.

References

 
 
 
  
 Station on navigable O.S. map

External links
 Stratton Village web site

Disused railway stations in Dorset
Former Great Western Railway stations
Railway stations in Great Britain opened in 1933
Railway stations in Great Britain closed in 1966
Beeching closures in England